Enon was an indie rock band founded by John Schmersal, Rick Lee, and Steve Calhoon that was active from 1999 to 2011; for most of its history, however, Enon was a three-piece outfit composed of Schmersal, Toko Yasuda, and Matt Schulz. Though situated for a time in Philadelphia, Enon was known for being part of the New York music scene.

Biography
Schmersal was originally in the band Brainiac and formed Enon (named after the village in Ohio, which is close to Schmersal's hometown of Dayton) with Lee and Calhoon following the death of Brainiac's singer Timmy Taylor and their subsequent disbandment. After Brainiac, Schmersal made a solo album under the name John Stuart Mill. Rick Lee and Steve Calhoon were both previous members of the band Skeleton Key, a befriended band Brainiac had toured with. Together they formed Enon. Lee created a number of percussion sounds for the band playing a "junk kit" including a Radio Flyer wagon, propane tank, and old hubcaps.

After the release of their first album Believo! which was Produced by D. Sardy and signed to his SeeThru Broadcasting label in 1999, Calhoon left the band and was replaced by Toko Yasuda (bass/vocals/keyboard) and Matt Schulz (drums). Yasuda was previously in the bands Blonde Redhead, The Lapse and The Van Pelt. With the new lineup, Enon released High Society also produced by Sardy in 2002 and toured with The Faint. A majority of Enon's albums have been released on the Chicago-based indie label, Touch and Go Records after the closing of SeeThru Broadcasting.  Lee left the band, and Enon went on to release Hocus Pocus in 2003, and a collection of singles and previously difficult to find internet-released songs with a bonus DVD entitled Lost Marbles & Exploded Evidence in February 2005. In 2007, all three members of Enon contributed to Les Savy Fav's album Let's Stay Friends. Yasuda also did vocal contributions to previous recordings of this band, e.g. the first track of The Cat and the Cobra.

Enon released their fourth and final studio album, Grass Geysers...Carbon Clouds on Touch and Go Records on October 9, 2007.

In summer 2008, drummer Matt Schulz announced that he would be leaving the group to pursue other interests. Afterwards he joined Holy Fuck as a touring member.

Brainiac's former bassist, Monasterio, directs music videos, including two for Enon, and released an album in 2008 with a new band called Model/Actress; Schmersal makes appearances on this album.

Instrumentation
Enon was known for using Moog synthesizers and Teisco guitars. Schmersal's green guitar he often uses on stage is a Teisco TG-64, he also owns a Teisco Del Ray. Yasuda plays a Fender Jazz Bass with an adapted tuning machine, which allows quickly tuning to D from E. Schmersal also owns a custom built Twister guitar built by Yuri Landman, an alternate version of the Springtime exclusively crafted for Enon with some additional features such as a scalloped fretboard and an additional pickup in the bridge.

Breakup
In a May 2011 interview, after touring with Caribou for a good portion of 2010 and 2011, Schmersal confirmed the band "is pretty much over" with no plans to follow up on Grass Geysers...Carbon Clouds.  From 2011-2014 Yasuda toured with St. Vincent playing synth.

TV, commercial and production work
While performing with Enon, Schmersal (sometimes accompanied by Yasuda) found himself in demand as a composer for short films, animated programs, bumpers and interstitials, and commercials for clients including Disney, Cartoon Network, MTV and Nickelodeon.  Many of these instrumentals feature the signature electro-analog quirkiness emblematic of Enon.

In 2005, Schmersal relocated to Philadelphia and opened his own recording studio.  Mean Reds, Thunderbirds Are Now! and other bands recorded albums with Schmersal in this period.  Schmersal's music was used for series opens, promo packages and channel branding for Sundance Channel in this period, as well as scoring work for the animated feature Monster House (with composer David Sardy) and the award-winning 2007 indie film Tie A Yellow Ribbon.

An otherwise unreleased song called "We Are The Robots" was used in the February 2008 episode of cult children's TV series Yo Gabba Gabba! titled "Robot."  The 1:21 song was accompanied by animation of robots playing with children and assisting with household chores.  In 2009, Schmersal and Yasuda recorded the opening theme for PBS Kids show Dash's Dance Party.

John Stuart Mill
Prior to the recording and release of Believo!, Schmersal recorded and released a solo album under the name John Stuart Mill, after the British philosopher and political economist.  Schemeral released one 13-track album, "Forget Everything," as John Stuart Mill on See-Thru Broadcasting in 1999.  The album was released on CD only and quickly went out of print when the label folded.  Columbus-based Scioto Records reissued "Forget Everything" on Bandcamp and on vinyl in 2016.

Crooks On Tape
In 2010 Schmersal reteamed with Enon's Rick Lee and drummer Joey Galvan to create the improvisational trio Crooks On Tape.  The band released the album "Fingerprint" on Misra Records in 2013 and an instrumental, vinyl-only album "In The Realm Of The Ancient Minor" on Pure Orgone for Record Store Day 2015.

Plvs Vltra
Since 2012 Yasuda has recorded under the name Plvs Vltra, releasing the solo album Parthenon on Spectrum Spools in 2012.  Schmersal produced that album, which also features appearances from Danny Ray Thompson of the Sun Ra Arkestra, Scott Allen of Thunderbirds Are Now, Thomas Keville of Man Man.

In 2013 Plvs Vltra released the non-LP single "Rooftop Arcade" b/w "Mesopotamia" on Columbus-based Scioto Records.  That same year, Plvs Vltra released second album Yo-Yo Blue on Bandcamp and on the cassette-only label Field Hymns.

Vertical Scratchers
In 2014 Schmersal collaborated with drummer Christian Eric Beaulieu (Triclops!, Anywhere, Peace Creeps) to form Vertical Scratchers.  The band released the album Daughter of Everything on Merge Records in 2014 which featured guest appearances by Jonathan Hischke (Flying Luttenbachers, Hella, Broken Bells) and fellow Daytonite Robert Pollard (Guided By Voices).  Pitchfork gave the album a 7.2 rating, calling the music "rock‘n’roll rendered on Etch A Sketch...occasionally, you find yourself marveling at an accidental masterpiece."

Vertical Scratchers also contributed an exclusive track, "Jackie's Favorite," to the Merge 7-inch box set Or Thousands Of Prizes.

Members

Members
Final Members
 John Schmersal – Vocals, guitars, synthesizers
 Toko Yasuda – Bass, vocals, synthesizers
Past Members
 Rick Lee - Synthesizers, samples
 Steve Calhoon - Drums, percussions
 Matt Schulz - Drums, percussions

Timeline

Discography

Albums
1998 Long Play (Pure Orgone) (self-released instrumental CD-R)
2000 Believo! (See-Thru Broadcasting)
2001 On Hold (self-released instrumental CD-R)
2002 High Society (Touch and Go)
2003 Hocus Pocus (Touch and Go)
2004 On Hold (vinyl reissue of instrumental album with different cover art and exclusive bonus track "Lost Marble Collection") (Slowboy Records, Germany)
2005 Lost Marbles & Exploded Evidence (compilation album + DVD set) (Touch and Go)
2007 Grass Geysers...Carbon Clouds (Touch and Go)

Singles
1998 "Fly South" / "The List Of Short Demands" 7-inch (All City Crossroads)
1999 "Motor Cross" / "Burning The Bread" 7-inch (Liquefaction Empire)
1999 "To Whom It May Consume" / "Suz EQ" (bonus 7-inch included with second pressing of Believo! on vinyl) (See-Thru Broadcasting)
2001 "Listen (While You Talk)" / "By-Ways and Oddities" 7-inch (The Self-Starter Foundation)
2001 "Marbles Explode" / "Raisin Heart" 7-inch (Friction Records)
2001 "The Nightmare Of Atomic Men", Sub Pop Records 7-inch (Sub Pop Singles Club June 2001, limited to 1300 copies)
2002 Enon (self-titled) aka "Normal Is Happening" 7-track 7-inch EP (Do Tell Records)
2002 "Drowning Appointments" / "Perfect Draft" 7-inch (French Kiss)
2003 "Evidence" / "Grain Of Assault" 7-inch (Troubleman Records)
2003 "In This City" 3-track remix 12-inch (Touch and Go)
2003 "In This City" CD-ROM EP with three bonus videos (Touch and Go)
2003 "Because Of You" (split 7-inch with The Bloodthirsty Lovers) (ShingleStreet)
2003 "Starcastic" / "Birdnest" 7-inch (Touch and Go)
2004 "Kanon Kanon"/"Undone" (bonus 7-inch included with vinyl reissue of "On Hold") (Slowboy Records, Germany)
2007 "Little Ghost / Swab The Deck" 7-inch (Silver Rocket, Czech Republic)
2007 "Annashade" (iTunes bonus track to Grass Geysers...Carbon Clouds) (Touch and Go)
2007 "Bonus Songs" (tour-only 7-inch, self-released)

Song Of The Month
From April 2002 to December 2003, Enon released a free unreleased song once a month on their official website.  All songs were made available as 128kbps MP3 downloads and only available during the month they were released.
April 2002 "Party Favor" (later released on Lost Marbles & Exploded Evidence)
May 2002 "Out Of Phase"
June 2002 "May King Merry! Merry!" (retitled "Making Merry! Merry!" and later released on Lost Marbles & Exploded Evidence)
July 2002 "Cheri Read"
August 2002 "Birdnest" (later released on the "Starcastic" 7-inch)
September 2002 "Learning Curve"
October 2002 "High Society" [demo version]
November 2002 "Little Shiver (G.W. Push)"
December 2002 "Xmas In July"
January 2003 "DiscoLlama Valentines"
February 2003 "March Of The Symbols"
March 2003 "Making History"
April 2003 "Snaggletooth"
May 2003 "Dear Darby Crashed"
June 2003 "Disposable Parts" (Eli Janney remix)
July 2003 "Sayonara"
August 2003 "Adalania (Not So Fair)" (different vocal mix than version released on Lost Marbles & Exploded Evidence)
September 2003 "Quantitea vs. Qualitea"
October 2003 "Average Lifespan of a Thrill"
November 2003 "Knock That Door" (later released on Lost Marbles & Exploded Evidence)
December 2003 "Genie's Got Her Bag" (later released on Lost Marbles & Exploded Evidence)

Videography
"Come Into" (2001, directed by Paul Cordes Wilm)
"Cruel" (2001, directed by Paul Cordes Wilm)
"Window Display" (2002, directed by Brian Quain, not an official video)
"Carbonation" (July 2002, directed by Paul Cordes Wilm)
"Pleasure and Privilege" (October 2002, directed by Clark Vogeler)
"In This City" (February 2003, directed by Josh Graham, Juan Monasterio, and Arya Senboutaraj)
"Murder Sounds"  (2004, directed by Paul Cordes Wilm)
"Daughter in the House of Fools" (2004, directed by Rainbows & Vampires)
"Mikazuki" (2004, directed by The Wilderness)

See also
Brainiac
Crooks On Tape
Plvs Vltra
Vertical Scratchers
Blonde Redhead
Deerhoof
Les Savy Fav
The Lapse
The Van Pelt
David Sardy

References

External links

Enon official site (flash)
SF Weekly review Enon with The Blacks at SF's Bottom of the Hill on 4/14/2008
Lazy-i Interview: October 2003
Lazy-i Interview: June 2005
PUNKCAST#314 @ Mighty Robot, Brooklyn - Aug 22 2003. (RealPlayer)

Art rock musical groups
Indie pop groups from New York (state)
Indie pop groups from Pennsylvania
Indie rock musical groups from New York (state)
Indie rock musical groups from Pennsylvania
Musical groups established in 1999
Musical groups from Philadelphia
Touch and Go Records artists
1999 establishments in New York (state)